Greg Mamula is a baseball coach and former infielder, who is the current head baseball coach of the Delaware Fightin' Blue Hens. He played college baseball at St. Bonaventure from 1995 to 1998.

Playing career
Mamula grew up in DuBois, Pennsylvania, where he attended DuBois Area Senior High School. Mamula would go on to play college baseball for the St. Bonaventure Bonnies.

Coaching career
In June 2022, Mamula was named the head coach of the Delaware Fightin' Blue Hens.

Head coaching record

References

External links
Delaware Fightin' Blue Hens bio

Year of birth missing (living people)
Living people
Cincinnati Bearcats baseball coaches
Delaware Fightin' Blue Hens baseball coaches
Florida Atlantic Owls baseball coaches
Shippensburg Raiders baseball coaches
St. Bonaventure Bonnies baseball players
West Chester Golden Rams baseball coaches